Zachary Ryan Thompson (born October 23, 1993) is an American professional baseball pitcher for the Toronto Blue Jays of Major League Baseball (MLB). He previously played for the Miami Marlins and Pittsburgh Pirates. He was drafted by the Chicago White Sox in the 5th round of the 2014 Major League Baseball draft.

Career

Chicago White Sox
Thompson was drafted by the Pittsburgh Pirates in the 48th round of the 2011 Major League Baseball draft but did not sign and attended the University of Texas at Arlington. He was then drafted by the Chicago White Sox in the 5th round of the 2014 Major League Baseball draft and signed. He made his professional debut with the rookie ball Great Falls Voyagers.

In 2015, Thompson played for the Single-A Kannapolis Intimidators, recording a 3–8 record and 4.44 ERA in 16 appearances. The next year, he split the season between the High-A Winston-Salem Dash and Kannapolis, accumulating a 9–8 record and 3.77 ERA in 140.2 innings of work. He remained with Winston-Salem for the 2017 season, pitching to a 2–7 record and 5.50 ERA with 73 strikeouts. In 2018, Thompson split the season between the Double-A Birmingham Barons and Winston-Salem, posting a 6–1 record and stellar 1.55 ERA in 43 games.

In 2019, Thompson split the year between the Triple-A Charlotte Knights and Birmingham, pitching to a 5–2 record and 5.23 ERA with 84 strikeouts in 75.2 innings pitched. Thompson did not play in a game in 2020 due to the cancellation of the minor league season because of the COVID-19 pandemic. On November 2, 2020, he elected free agency.

Miami Marlins
On November 23, 2020, Thompson signed a minor league contract with the Miami Marlins organization that included an invitation to spring training. He was assigned to the Triple-A Jacksonville Jumbo Shrimp to begin the season.

On June 5, 2021, Thompson was selected to the 40-man roster and promoted to the major leagues for the first time. He made his MLB debut on June 7 as the starting pitcher against the Boston Red Sox, taking the loss after allowing two runs on four hits in three innings; he recorded his first major league strikeout against Kiké Hernández.

Pittsburgh Pirates
On November 29, 2021, the Marlins traded Thompson, Connor Scott, and Kyle Nicolas to the Pittsburgh Pirates for Jacob Stallings. Thompson made 29 appearances (22 starts) for Pittsburgh in 2022, posting a 3-10 record and 5.18 ERA with 90 strikeouts in 121.2 innings pitched.

On January 5, 2023, Thompson was designated for assignment by Pittsburgh after the signing of Rich Hill was made official.

Toronto Blue Jays
On January 10, 2023, Thompson was traded to the Toronto Blue Jays for Chavez Young.

Personal life
Thompson and his wife, Ashlyn, married in December 2017 and have one daughter together.

References

External links

UT Arlington Mavericks bio

1993 births
Living people
People from Burleson, Texas
Baseball players from Texas
Major League Baseball pitchers
Miami Marlins players
Pittsburgh Pirates players
UT Arlington Mavericks baseball players
Great Falls Voyagers players
Kannapolis Intimidators players
Winston-Salem Dash players
Birmingham Barons players
Charlotte Knights players
Jacksonville Jumbo Shrimp players
Glendale Desert Dogs players